Hierodula parviceps is a species of praying mantis in the family Mantidae.

References

parviceps
Articles created by Qbugbot
Insects described in 1877